Famy, officially the Municipality of Famy,  is a 5th class municipality in the province of Laguna, Philippines. According to the 2020 census, it has a population of 16,791 people, making it as the least populated municipality in the province.

Famy lies in the north-eastern part of the province of Laguna via Manila East Road.

History
The history of the town as a barrio of Siniloan dates back to the year 1612 when its natural resources were first exploited by the busy hands of home seekers from Daraitan, Tanay, Rizal. These home seekers named the place Calumpang, after a big shady Calumpang tree that grows in the heart of the place.

Year after year, the inhabitants of the place increased. People from nearby towns were attracted to the barrio because of the vast area of uncultivated lands. After years of struggle for development, they succeeded in making the lands suitable for food crops. They especially made use of the lowlands where more of the inhabitants settled. Home industries gained interest among women. Spiny bamboos were planted as raw materials for the basket industry that remained an important industry in the present time.

In the year 1835, when the people realized the changes of the place, from the bedlam of wilderness to a barrio worthy of becoming a town, they for the first time, sought to become a municipality with its own government. The plan was rejected because of the meager population of the barrio. The people did not lose hope. Again the prominent men of the barrio tried to secure the separation. Stimulated by the feeling of patriotism, men from the barrio voluntarily presented themselves as revolutionist claiming that they will fight on the side of General Emilio Aguinaldo, if the General will help making the barrio a town. So after the revolution, the President of the Republic of the Philippines ordered that Calumpang be separated from the Municipality of Siniloan. Barrio Calumpang was then renamed FAMY. This was in memory of General Emilio Aguinaldo's mother, Mrs. Trinidad Aguinaldo y Famy.

When the American took possession of the Philippines, the form of government automatically changed. With an Executive Order, small towns became barrios of nearby towns. Famy was affected by this order, and again became a barrio of Siniloan. In spite of these changes the people continued the development of the barrio. They tried their best to increase the area of cultivated lands. The inhabitants of this municipality were not satisfied of being a barrio again of Siniloan, so they filed a request to the Governor General that Famy be a town again, citing that no salary for services rendered will be asked and that the municipal hall and school buildings shall be constructed, all on the help of the town's people. By virtue of this request, the Governor General issued Executive Order No. 60 series of 1910, separating Famy from the Municipality of Siniloan, Laguna. This order took effect on August 15, 1910.

Geography

Barangays

Famy is politically subdivided into 20 barangays.

 Asana (Poblacion)
 Bacong-Sigsigan
 Bagong Pag-Asa (Poblacion)
 Balitoc
 Banaba (Poblacion)
 Batuhan
 Bulihan
 Caballero (Poblacion)
 Calumpang (Poblacion)
 Kapatalan
 Cuebang Bato
 Damayan (Poblacion)
 Kataypuanan
 Liyang
 Maate
 Magdalo (Poblacion)
 Mayatba
 Minayutan
 Salangbato
 Tunhac

Climate

Demographics

Economy

References

External links

[ Philippine Standard Geographic Code]
Philippine Census Information
Local Governance Performance Management System 

Municipalities of Laguna (province)
Populated places on Laguna de Bay